Timothy J. O'Driscoll (born April 22, 1964) is an American politician serving in the Minnesota House of Representatives since 2011. A member of the Republican Party of Minnesota, O'Driscoll represents District 13B in north-central Minnesota, which includes the cities of Sartell and Sauk Rapids and parts of Benton and Stearns Counties.

Early education and career
O'Driscoll graduated from Sartell High School in Sartell, then attended St. Cloud State University in St. Cloud, earning a B.S. in business education, office administration and real estate planning and development.

O'Driscoll served on the Sartell City Council from 1993 to 1995 and 2002 to 2006. In 2007, he was elected mayor of Sartell, a position he held until 2011. He also served as president of the Sartell Economic Development Authority, secretary and an executive board member of the St. Cloud Area Planning Organization, and board chair of the St. Cloud Area Joint Planning District. He is a founding member of Sartell's SummerFest. He is a corporate trainer for Kaplan Professional Schools and a former real estate agent.

Minnesota House of Representatives
O'Driscoll was elected to the Minnesota House of Representatives in 2010 and has been reelected every two years since. In 2017-18, he chaired the Government Operations & Elections Policy Committee. O'Driscoll is the minority lead on the Commerce Finance and Policy Committee and also serves on the Property Tax Division of the Taxes Committee.

Electoral history

References

External links 

 Rep. O'Driscoll Web Page
 Map of Minnesota House District 14A
 Project Votesmart - Rep. Tim O'Driscoll Profile
 Tim O'Driscoll Campaign Web Site

1964 births
Living people
People from Sartell, Minnesota
Republican Party members of the Minnesota House of Representatives
St. Cloud State University alumni
Mayors of places in Minnesota
21st-century American politicians